Tikhvin Cemetery is a historic cemetery in the centre of Saint Petersburg. It is part of the Alexander Nevsky Lavra and contains a large number of burials, including many notable Russian figures.

During the nineteenth and early twentieth centuries it was a popular burial site for statesmen and military personnel. Among those buried here were naval officers Fyodor Dubasov, Yuri Lisyansky, Pyotr Ricord, Zinovy Rozhestvensky and Alexei Senyavin; army officers Apostol Kostanda, Nikolay Leontiev, Valerian Madatov and Alexander Mikhailovsky-Danilevsky; and statesmen Alexander Abaza, Dmitry Bludov, Pavel Demidov, Ivan Durnovo, Mikhail Speransky and Pyotr Valuyev. Relatively few of these graves have survived to the present day. Scientists Sergey Lebedev and Ivan Tarkhanov were also buried here. 

The cemetery is most famous for its representatives from the arts world, some of whom were originally buried here, while others were reinterred here during the Soviet period. Composers and musicians buried in the cemetery include Alexander Borodin, César Cui, Alexander Dargomyzhsky, Alexander Glazunov, Mikhail Glinka, Modest Mussorgsky, Nikolai Rimsky-Korsakov, Anton Rubinstein and Pyotr Ilyich Tchaikovsky. Actors and performers Varvara Asenkova, Nikolay Cherkasov, Vera Komissarzhevskaya, Marius Petipa and Georgy Tovstonogov are buried here, as are painters and sculptors Mikhail Avilov, Vasily Demut-Malinovsky, Alexander Ivanov, Ivan Kramskoi, Boris Kustodiev and Ivan Shishkin. Luminaries from the world of literature represented in the cemetery include Yevgeny Baratynsky, Fyodor Dostoevsky, Ivan Gorbunov, Nikolay Karamzin, Ivan Krylov and Vladimir Stasov.

Establishment

The cemetery opened in 1823 to relieve overcrowding in the monastery's Lazarevskoe Cemetery. Initially called the "New Lazarevsky", it quickly expanded to cover a large area. Its cemetery church was consecrated in 1871 in the name of the icon of the Tikhvin Mother of God, from which the cemetery took its name. Burials initially took place in the eastern part of the cemetery, and in 1826 the writer Nikolay Karamzin was buried in the cemetery, followed in 1833 by Nikolay Gnedich, a contemporary of Alexander Pushkin's. From then on a number of figures associated with the arts' world were buried there, including Pushkin's contemporaries Ivan Krylov, Pyotr Vyazemsky, Pyotr Pletnyov, and Alexey Olenin. In 1844 another contemporary poet of Pushkin's, Yevgeny Baratynsky, was buried in the cemetery.

Over time the cemetery became a popular and prestigious burial ground for those of many areas of society. The wealthy merchant A.I. Kosikovsky was buried under a monumental sarcophagus on a high pedestal surmounted by a canopy on eight fluted columns. Opposite it stood a similarly grand monument to the statesman Pavel Demidov, which has since been lost. In 1857 the remains of the composer Mikhail Glinka were returned from Berlin and buried in the cemetery, with a grand monument erected two years later to the design of architect I. I. Gornostayev, with sculptures by Nikolay  Laveretsky. On 1 February 1881 the author Fyodor Dostoevsky was buried in the cemetery, with a similarly large monument. During the 1880s composers Modest Mussorgsky and Alexander Borodin were buried in the northern part of the grounds, with Pyotr Ilyich Tchaikovsky following in 1891.

By the beginning of the 20th century the Tikhvin cemetery contained 1,325 monuments of various designs and sizes, including monumental crosses on pedestals, sarcophagi and steles. There were several family plots with chapels and large crypts of granite and marble.

Soviet necropolis

During the early Soviet period a number of monuments were stolen or destroyed. The cemetery was officially closed for burials in 1927, though they continued until 1932, and it was decided to turn it into a necropolis museum, displaying historically and artistically significant graves. Alongside this was concept of gathering together the graves of the friends and contemporaries of Alexander Pushkin for the 1937 centenary commemorations of the poet's death. Plans were drawn up by architects E.N. Sandler and E.K. Reimers, with further input from the city's chief architect L.A. Ilyin. The Funeral Affair Trust was established to run the necropolis museum, including removing abandoned gravestones for sale as building materials. The reconstruction radically altered the nature and appearance of the Tikhvin cemetery. With the intention being to create an "artists' necropolis", graves of those from other sections of society were removed. Fewer than a hundred of the original monuments were preserved. Meanwhile, the remains of prominent artists, sculptors, composers and musicians were reburied in the cemetery. Among them were personal friends of Pushkin, including Konstantin Danzas, Anton Delvig, and Fyodor Matyushkin.

The organisers were faced with the problem that despite designating the cemetery to be the artists' necropolis, historically the Tikhvin had primarily been the burial ground of statesmen, military leaders, scientists, and composers. There were relatively few graves of writers, who had tended to prefer the Smolensky Cemetery; or artists, who had traditionally chosen the Nikolskoe or Novodevichy Cemetery.  This necessitated the transfer of a large number of burials and monuments, which took place in two main periods, from 1936 to 1941 and from 1948 to 1952. There were also several burials of prominent Soviet citizens, as the cemetery gained the status of an urban pantheon. Those buried here included the scientist Sergey Lebedev in 1934, artist Mikhail Avilov in 1954, and actor Nikolay Cherkasov in 1966. In 1972 the remains of the composer Alexander Glazunov were transferred from Paris. In 1968 Fyodor Dostoevsky's wife Anna Dostoevskaya was reburied next to her husband, while theatre director Georgy Tovstonogov was interred in the cemetery in 1989. So far Tovstonogov's has been the last burial to take place in the cemetery.

Military

Scientists

Statesmen and politicians

Architects

Composers and musicians

Actors, actresses and dancers

Artists and painters

Writers and poets

References

Cemeteries in Saint Petersburg
 
Cemeteries in the Alexander Nevsky Lavra
Tikhvin